Seferovići may refer to:

 Seferovići (Bugojno), a village in Bosnia and Herzegovina
 Seferovići (Gornji Vakuf), a village in Bosnia and Herzegovina